The women's discus throw event at the 1970 British Commonwealth Games was held on 18 July at the Meadowbank Stadium in Edinburgh, Scotland.

Results

References

Results (p9)

Athletics at the 1970 British Commonwealth Games
1970